The First Tschentscher senate was the state government of Hamburg between 2018 and 2020, sworn in on 28 March 2018 after Peter Tschentscher was elected as First Mayor by the members of the Hamburg Parliament. It was the 29th Senate of Hamburg.

It was formed after the resignation of First Mayor Olaf Scholz, and was a continuation of the coalition government formed by the Social Democratic Party (SPD) and Alliance 90/The Greens (GRÜNE) after the 2015 Hamburg state election. Excluding the First Mayor, the senate comprised 11 ministers, called Senators. Seven were members of the SPD, three were members of the Greens, and one was an independent politician.

The first Tschentscher senate was succeeded by the second Tschentscher senate on 10 June 2020.

Formation 
The previous Senate was a coalition government of the SPD and Greens led by First Mayor Olaf Scholz. On 9 March 2018, he announced his switch to federal politics after being nominated as Vice-Chancellor and Minister for Finance in the fourth Merkel cabinet.

The same day, finance senator Peter Tschentscher was nominated as his successor by the SPD executive. Scholz formally resigned on 13 March. Tschentscher was approved by the party congress on 24 March with 95% of votes in favour.

Peter Tschentscher was elected as First Mayor by the Parliament on 28 March, winning 71 votes out of 121 cast.

Composition 
The composition of the Senate at the time of its dissolution was as follows:

References 

Cabinets of Hamburg
State governments of Germany
Cabinets established in 2018
2018 establishments in Germany
2020 disestablishments in Germany
Cabinets disestablished in 2020